is a Japanese voice actress and singer affiliated with 81 Produce. Some of her noteworthy roles include Yoshino Nanase in Wake Up, Girls!, Guri in Love Tyrant, Makoto in Shachibato! President, It's Time for Battle!, and Hitori Gotō in Bocchi the Rock!.

Biography
Aoyama was born in Kumamoto Prefecture on May 15, 1996. In middle school, Aoyama was a member of her school's chorus club, where she spent most of her time. She was also a fan of various manga series, especially Samurai Deeper Kyo. As a result, she decided to pursue a career in voice acting. After attending some open auditions only to not be cast, she was eventually cast as Yoshino Nanase in Wake Up, Girls! via an open audition. In 2015, Aoyama, along with the Wake Up, Girls! voice actor unit, won the special award at the 9th Seiyu Awards.

In March 2020, Aoyama went on hiatus due for medical reasons. She returned to work the next month.

On March 9, 2022, she made her solo singer debut with her first single, "Page". Later that year, she was cast as Hitori Gotō in the anime television series Bocchi the Rock!

Filmography

TV series
2014
 Wake Up, Girls! as Yoshino Nanase

2016
 Scorching Ping Pong Girls as Yura Yuragi

2017
 Love Tyrant as Guri
 Restaurant to Another World as Tiana Silvario XVI

2019
 The Promised Neverland as Alicia, Mark

2020
 Natsunagu! as Izumi Chiba
 Seton Academy: Join the Pack! as Chroe Mashima
 Shachibato! President, It's Time for Battle! as Makoto
 Deca-Dence as Linmei
 Maesetsu! as Culture Festival Emcee (2)

2021
 86 as Female Student
 Duel Masters King! as Pyonchiki
 Kageki Shojo!! as Akina Horiguchi
 PuraOre! Pride of Orange as Mami Ono

2022
 Bocchi the Rock! as Hitori Gotō
 Umayuru as Tsurumaru Tsuyoshi

2023
 Pokémon as Gurumin

Video games
2018
 Tokimeki Idol as Tsubasa Aoyama

Dubbing
2019
Thomas & Friends as Nia

References

External links
 Official agency profile 
 Official Artist Website 
 

1996 births
81 Produce voice actors
Living people
Japanese video game actresses
Japanese voice actresses
Seiyu Award winners
Voice actresses from Kumamoto Prefecture
Japanese women pop singers
21st-century Japanese singers
21st-century Japanese women singers
 Teichiku Records artists